The 2006–07 Highland Football League was won by Keith. Fort William finished bottom.

Table

Results

References

Highland Football League seasons
5
Scottish